The following is a timeline of the history of the city of San Antonio, Texas, United States.

18th century

 1718 – San Antonio founded by Martín de Alarcón.
 1718 – Mission San Antonio de Valero founded.
 1720 – Mission San Jose founded.
 1722 – Presidio San Antonio de Bexar built.
 1731 – Juan Leal Goraz becomes first mayor.
 1750 – Church of San Fernando completed.
 1782 – Mission San Jose building constructed.

19th century

 1811 – January 22: Juan Baptista de Las Casas, a retired captain from Nuevo Santander, along with several revolutionaries buoyed by the successes of Hidalgo's army in Guanajuato,  march into town and arrest the Governors Herrera and Salcedo. Spain stops sending money for troops.
 1813 – August: Battle of Medina occurs near town.
 1821 – San Antonio becomes part of the Mexican Empire.
 1835 - Oct 12 - Dec 11: Siege of Béxar
 1836 – February 23 – March 6: Battle of the Alamo.
 1837 – John William Smith becomes mayor.
 1840 – March 19: Council House Fight.
 1842 – September 17: Battle of Salado Creek occurs near town.
 1845 – San Antonio becomes part of the new U.S. state of Texas.
 1849 – Cholera epidemic.
 1852 – St. Mary's Institute founded.
 1853 – Public schools established.
 1860 – Population: 8,235.
 1865
 U.S. Army Fort Sam Houston established.
 Juneteenth is an American holiday that commemorates the June 19, 1865 announcement of the abolition of slavery in the U.S. state of Texas. 
 San Antonio Express newspaper begins publication.
 1868 – Frost Bank established.
 1871 – Mount Zion Baptist Church founded.
 1872 – Alamo Literary Society formed.
 1874 – Catholic Diocese of San Antonio and Temple Beth-El congregation founded.
 1875 – Sociedad Benevolencia Mexicana founded.
 1878 – Railroad begins operating.
 1880 – Population: 20,550.
 1881 – Evening Light newspaper begins publication.
 1883 – San Antonio Brewing Company in business.
 1884
 March 11: Vaudeville Theater Ambush.
 Societa Italiana di Mutuo Soccorso founded.
 1885
 Scholz's Palm Garden in business.
 Alamo City Commercial College established.
 1890 – Population: 37,673.
 1891 – Battle of Flowers festival begins.
 1891 – The San Antonio Fire Department established.
 1894 – Peacock Military College established.
 1896

 Buckhorn Saloon and Gebhardt's Chili Powder Company in business.
 Bexar County Courthouse built.
 1898 – Woman's Club of San Antonio founded.
 1899 – Brackenridge Park created.
 1900
 Incarnate Word Academy for females established.
 Population: 53,321.

20th century

1900s–1940s

 1903 – San Antonio Public Library established.
 1910 – Population: 96,614.
 1912 – Alamo Methodist Church built.
 1914 – San Antonio Zoo founded.
1914 - River Park (predecessor to the River Walk) is completed.
 1917 – U.S. Army Kelly Air Force Base established.
 1918
 U.S. Army Brooks Air Force Base established.
 San Antonio Evening News begins publication.
 1920 – Population: 161,379.
 1921 – September 1921 San Antonio floods.
 1922 – WOAI radio begins broadcasting.
 1924 – San Antonio Conservation Society formed.
 1925 – San Antonio Junior College founded.
 1926
 Aztec Theater opens.
 Witte Museum and Texas Cavaliers established.
 1927 – KONO radio begins broadcasting.
 1928 – Air conditioning installed in hi-rise Milam Building.
 1930 – Population: 231,542.
 1931 – U.S. Army Randolph Air Force Base begins operating.
 1932 – Frito Company in business.
 1933 – Earl Abel's restaurant in business.
 1937
 San Antonio Housing Authority established.
 Station Hospital rebuilt.
 1938
  Pecan-sheller labor strike.
 Ciculo Social Femenino Mexicano founded.
1939
WPA construction begins on Robert H.H. Hugman's vision to transform River Park to Spanish-Style shops of Aragon and Romula.
 1940
 Alamo Stadium built.
 Hertzberg Circus Museum established.
 Population: 253,854.
 1941
 U.S. military Lackland Air Force Base, Broadway National Bank, and San Jose Mission National Historic Site established.
 Mi Tierra restaurant in business.
The San Antonio River Walk is completed
 1946
 Brooke Army Medical Center active.
 Casa Rio restaurant in business.
 1947
 Jim's eatery and Josephine Theatre in business.
 Southwest Research Institute headquartered in city.
 1948 – Sultanas de Bejar (women's group) formed.
 1949 – WOAI-TV (television) begins broadcasting.

1950s–1990s

 1950
 Free port and Stock Show and Rodeo established.
 KENS-TV (television) begins broadcasting.
 Population: 408,442.
 1958 – Fiesta Noche del Rio begins.
 1960 – Population: 587,718.
 1961 – Henry B. Gonzalez becomes U.S. representative for Texas's 20th congressional district.

 1968
 Tower of the Americas erected.
 HemisFair Arena opens.
 HemisFair '68 held.
 Institute of Texan Cultures established.
 Hilton Palacio del Rio hotel in business.
 1969 – Paseo Del Rio Association formed.
 1970 – Population: 654,153.
 1972 – Texas Folklife Festival begins.
 1973 – San Antonio Spurs basketball team active.
 1975 – Lila Cockrell elected Mayor, San Antonio's first woman mayor.
 1978 – City passes ordinance creating VIA Metropolitan Transit Authority, the public transport system for San Antonio.
 1980
 San Antonio Botanical Garden opens.
 Annual Tejano Music Awards begin.
 Area of city: 263.5 square miles.
 San Antonio Food Bank active (approximate date).
 Population: 785,880.
 In 1980, Texas was the first state to establish Juneteenth as a state holiday under legislation introduced by freshman Democratic state representative Al Edwards. 
 1981
 San Antonio Museum of Art established.
 Hyatt Regency San Antonio hotel in business.
 Henry Cisneros becomes mayor.
 1987 – Lamar S. Smith becomes U.S. representative for Texas's 21st congressional district.
 1988 – SeaWorld in business.
 1990 – Population: 935,933.
 1991 – Nelson W. Wolff becomes mayor.
 1992 – Fiesta Texas in business.
 1995
 City website online (approximate date).
 Artpace founded.
 New  San Antonio Public Library's central library opens.
 1997 – 55th World Science Fiction Convention held.
 2000
 Bahá'í Center of San Antonio founded.
 Population: 1,144,646.

21st century

 2001 – Gurudwara Sikh Center of San Antonio founded.
 2005 – Municipal Archives established.
 2007 – Port Authority of San Antonio founded.
 2008 – Spurs Community Garden created.
 2009 – San Antonio mayoral election, 2009 held; Julian Castro (2014 head of HUD) becomes mayor.
 NOWCastSA community news begins publication.
 2010
 Population: city 1,327,407; metro 2,142,508; megaregion 19,728,244.
 Area of city: 460.93 square miles.
 2011 – Population: 1,359,758; metro 2,194,927.
 2013
 BiblioTech public library opens.
 Population: 1,409,019.
 Joaquin Castro becomes U.S. representative for Texas's 20th congressional district.
 2014 – Ivy Taylor becomes first African-American female mayor of San Antonio.
 2015 – May: San Antonio mayoral election, 2015, held.
 2018
 April: Baboons escape from Texas Biomedical Research Institute.
 San Antonio celebrates the Tricentennial anniversary of its founding.
 2022 – June: At least 46 people are found dead inside a tractor-trailer in San Antonio.

See also
 History of San Antonio
 History of African Americans in San Antonio
 List of mayors of San Antonio
 National Register of Historic Places listings in Bexar County, Texas
 Timelines of other cities in the South Texas area of Texas: Brownsville, Corpus Christi, Laredo, McAllen

References

Bibliography

Published in the 19th century

Published in the 20th century
 
 
 
 
 
 
 
 
 Charles W. Ramsdell, San Antonio: A Historical and Pictorial Guide (Austin: University of Texas Press, 1959).
 
 T. R. Fehrenbach, The San Antonio Story (Tulsa, Oklahoma: Continental Heritage Press, 1978)
 
 
 Tejano Religion and Ethnicity, San Antonio, 1821–1860

Published in the 21st century

External links

 
 
 
 U.S. Library of Congress, Prints & Photos Division. Materials related to San Antonio, Texas, various dates.
 Digital Public Library of America. Items related to San Antonio, various dates
 
 
 
 

 
san antonio